Oroua may refer to:

 Oroua River, a river in the North Island of New Zealand
 Oroua County, a county in the North Island of New Zealand
 Oroua (New Zealand electorate), a parliamentary electorate in New Zealand from 1902 to 1938